Clypeostoma meteorae is a species of sea snail, a marine gastropod mollusk in the family Chilodontidae.

Description
The length of the shell is less than 8 mm. The basal callus shield is not extensive and has a well-developed dentition. The dentition of the aperture is also well developed.

Distribution
This species occurs in the Red Sea, the Gulf of Aden and the western Indian Ocean.

References

External links
 Herbert D.G. (2012) A revision of the Chilodontidae (Gastropoda: Vetigastropoda: Seguenzioidea) of southern Africa and the south-western Indian Ocean. African Invertebrates, 53(2): 381–502.

meteorae
Molluscs of the Indian Ocean
Gastropods described in 1998